Seguros Azteca is a Mexican life insurance company owned by Grupo Salinas since 2003. The Chief Executive Officer (CEO) is Alfredo Honsberg.

In October 2003, Grupo Elektra (a unit of Grupo Salinas) was authorized by the Secretaría de Hacienda y Crédito Público to acquire a private insurance company in Mexico that was re-branded Seguros Azteca". During the second quarter of 2004, Seguros Azteca started operations in Mexico. It offers life insurance and other basic policies.

External links
Company site 
Profile at Grupo Salinas

Grupo Salinas
Insurance companies of Mexico
Mexican brands